Gillian Allnutt (born 15 January 1949 in London) is an English poet, author of 9 collections and recipient of several prizes including the 2016 Queen's Gold Medal for Poetry.

Life
Allnutt was born in London, but was educated at La Sagesse School in Newcastle upon Tyne. She attended the University of Sussex and Newnham College in Cambridge. She returned to the North East in 1988,  and now lives in Esh Winning, County Durham.

Her books Nantucket and the Angel and Lintel were both shortlisted for the T. S. Eliot Prize. She read Philosophy and English at Cambridge, and from 1983 to 1988 she was poetry editor of City Limits magazine. Her collections Nantucket and the Angel and Lintel were both shortlisted for the T.S. Eliot Prize. Poems from these collections are included in her Bloodaxe retrospective How the Bicycle Shone: New & Selected Poems (2007), which draws on six published books plus a new collection, Wolf Light, and was a Poetry Book Society Special Commendation. Her latest collection is indwelling. She has also published Berthing: A Poetry Workbook (NEC/Virago, 1991), and was co-editor of The New British Poetry (Paladin, 1988). From 2001 to 2003 she held a Royal Literary Fund Fellowship at Newcastle and Leeds Universities. She won the Northern Rock Foundation Writer's Award in 2005 and received a Cholmondeley Award in 2010. Since 1983 she has taught creative writing in a variety of contexts, mainly in adult education and as a writer in schools. In 2009/10 she held a writing residency with The Medical Foundation for the Care of Victims of Torture (now Freedom From Torture) in the North East, working with asylum seekers in Newcastle and Stockton. In 2013/14 she taught creative writing to undergraduates on the Poetry and Poetics course in the English Department of Durham University. Gillian Allnutt has been named as the recipient of The Queen's Gold Medal for Poetry 2016. The Medal is awarded for excellence in poetry, and was presented to Gillian Allnutt by The Queen in February 2017.

A photo of Gillian is on display in Room 37a at the National Portrait Gallery.

Bibliography

Poetry
Spitting the Pips Out (Sheba, 1981)
Beginning the Avocado (Virago, 1987)
Blackthorn (Bloodaxe Books, 1994) 
Nantucket and the Angel (Bloodaxe Books, 1997) 
Lintel (Bloodaxe Books, 2001) 
Sojourner (Bloodaxe Books, 2004) 
How the Bicycle Shone: New & Selected Poems (Bloodaxe Books, 2007) 
indwelling (Bloodaxe Books, 2013) 
wake (Bloodaxe Books, 2018)

Anthologies
The New British Poetry (Paladin, 1988) (co-editor)

Workbook
Berthing: A Poetry Workbook  (NEC/Virago, 1991)

References

External links

1949 births
Living people
English women poets
Alumni of Newnham College, Cambridge
People from Esh Winning